Tithraustes noctiluces is a moth of the family Notodontidae. It is found in Panama, Costa Rica and El Salvador.

It is the smallest species in the genus Tithraustes with a forewing length of 10.5–13 mm for males.

Larvae have been reared on Heliconia latispatha and palms in four different genera: Asterogyne martiana, Calyptrogyne trichostachys, Chamaedorea tepejilote and Geonoma cuneata.

References

Moths described in 1872
Notodontidae of South America